The Fermanagh & Western Football Association is one of four regional FAs within Northern Ireland and affiliated to the Irish FA, the others being the County Antrim FA (also known as the North East Ulster FA), the Mid-Ulster FA and the North-West FA.

History
The Fermanagh & Western FA was founded in 1907 following the expansion of the Fermanagh & South Tyrone FA (itself founded in 1904).  Although its responsibilities are now bound by the borders of Northern Ireland, initially the F&W FA ran football as far south as Sligo, Clones and Cavan.

Competitions
The three primary competitions organised by the Fermanagh & Western FA are the Fermanagh & Western Intermediate Cup, the Mercer League and the Mulhern Cup.

Mercer Cup Division One
Incomplete list of winners

Mulhern Cup Finals
Incomplete list of winners

Internationals
Three currently active Northern Ireland international footballers began their careers in Fermanagh & Western football: Roy Carroll, Ivan Sproule and Kyle Lafferty.

External links
Unofficial Fermanagh & Western Website

References 

Association football governing bodies in Northern Ireland
Sports organizations established in 1907